Winston Creek may refer to:

Winston Creek (Kenora District), a stream in Ontario, Canada
Winston Creek (Thunder Bay District), a stream in Ontario, Canada